The Moche River is one of the rivers of the Pacific Ocean slope, located in the northern coast of Peru, in La Libertad Region. On both sides of this river is the millenary Moche Valley. The Moche river goes through east to west the metropolitan area of Trujillo and its mouth is located in the Pacific Ocean in the limits of Moche and Victor Larco both towns of Trujillo city.

Description
The river rises in Laguna Grande about 3988 m near the village of Quiruvilca, with the name of Rio Grande, later adopting the names of the San Lorenzo river and Constancia river. At the height of the town of San Juan, about 14 km from its origin, takes its name of Moche River, which retains the same to its mouth at the sea.

See also
Moche (culture)
Trujillo
Valley of Moche
Countryside of Moche
Moche city
List of rivers of Peru
List of rivers of the Americas by coastline

External links

* Moche river near the Pacific ocean (wikimapia)
San Jose Festival

Multimedia
  in Trujillo city (Peru).

References

Rivers of Peru
Geography of Trujillo, Peru
Rivers of La Libertad Region